Georgy L. Ratner (1923–2001) was a Soviet and Russian surgeon, head of surgery at Samara State Medical University, and the founder of a school of vascular and heart surgeons in Russia.

References
  Obituary at the site of Cardiothoracic Surgery Network
 TV Encyclopedy of Samara Region (Russian)
 Scientific works of prof. Ratner listed in NCBI

External links
 Biography at LiveLib online library (Russian) 

1923 births
2001 deaths
Russian cardiac surgeons
20th-century surgeons
Soviet surgeons